is a sweet, bright green-colored liqueur made by Suntory, flavored with Yubari and muskmelon. It is manufactured in Japan, the United States, Mexico, and France. It was first released in 1964 under the name "Hermes Melon Liqueur", but changed its name to "Midori" in 1978. It was made exclusively in Japan until 1987. Midori is typically 20–21% alcohol by volume. Its name is the Japanese word for "green" (緑). The Midori formulated in France is sweeter than the original Japanese version.

As it is extremely sweet, Midori is not usually taken "straight"; it is generally used in a cocktail, Sour flavors are often combined with Midori in order to balance out its sweetness.

Famous cocktails including midori
 Japanese slipper (Midori, Cointreau, and lemon juice)
 Scooby snack (Midori, banana liqueur, coconut rum, and pineapple juice)
 Midori Sour (Midori, Vodka, lemon juice, lime juice, and soda water)

History
Although Hermes Melon Liqueur was released by Suntory in Japan in 1964, it was renamed "Midori" for its release to the US market at Studio 54 in New York City in 1978 during a party held by the cast, crew, and producers of Saturday Night Fever. By 1983, Midori was distributed in 20 countries. In 2013, following consumer research, Suntory reduced the sugar content and began producing Midori with a redesigned label and frosted glass bottle.

See also
 List of melon dishes

References

Fruit liqueurs
Japanese liqueurs
Melon drinks
Products introduced in 1978
Japanese brands
Suntory